Salford Shopping Centre (locally known as Salford Precinct and formerly named Salford Shopping City) is a shopping centre located in Salford, Greater Manchester, England. Built in 1972 in the Pendleton district of Salford, the shopping centre has been the subject of numerous redevelopment projects undertaken by Salford City Council. The centre has 81 indoor shopping units and an indoor market complex which sells a wide range of goods.

History

In 1952 the Ellor Street development plan was announced and was to be chaired by councillor Albert Jones. The plan proposed the demolition of 6,000 terraced houses over a 300-acre site in the Hanky Park (Hankinson Street) and Ellor Street areas of Pendleton. The area was to be cleared to make way for a new shopping centre designed to relieve 147 shops along the A6 road affected by road improvements and replace 120 corner shops set to be demolished under the development plan.

In 1962 the project, which was to cost £5.25 million (£95 million in 2013 terms) began.

The original proposal was to build a site which consisted of 260 shops, a market, spaces for 2,000 cars, plus a hotel, offices and flats. This prompted a local newspaper to run the story with the headline "It will be the finest in Europe."

Construction of the shopping centre and surrounding areas continued and on 21 May 1970 the new Salford Market officially opened. From 1971 onwards new shops inside the precinct itself began to open, the first of these being Tesco.

However, due to a lack of funds and a political scandal which saw chairman Albert Jones jailed for eight months construction of Salford Precinct was halted. The site had only 95 shop units compared to the proposed 260, the hotel and two storey car park were never built.

In 1991 the building was refurbished at a cost of £4 million, this included the installation of roofs across various walkways, making large swathes of the centre undercover. The shopping centre which at the time was known as "Salford Precinct" was renamed "Salford Shopping City."

On 9 August 1994 the Manchester Evening News reported that Salford City Council was planning on selling off Salford Shopping City to raise money for local housing repairs, these plans split the ruling Labour Party council, one councillor telling the press that it would be like "selling off the family silver."

In 2000 Salford Shopping City was eventually sold to a private company for £10 million in an effort to cut the council's deficit. It was then later sold in March 2010 to Praxis Holdings for £40 million, the company stated that it wanted to invest in the precinct and link it to the new food superstore.

Salford riots 2011

On 9 August 2011 a minority of people from Salford and its surrounding Manchester areas attacked several retail outlets at Salford Shopping City, as part of the larger scale riots experienced in England that summer.

Although shops on the inside of the centre remained largely untouched, outlets on Hankinson Way and Pendleton way were heavily damaged, one of the worst affected was Timpsons and Cash Converters, these outlets were both looted and set ablaze by rioters. Images of rioters breaking into several outlets on Hankinson Way including the Money Shop and Bargain Booze were broadcast on both local and national news programmes that day.

Several reasons have been put forward for the events that took place at Salford Shopping City that day, they include poor relations with local authority and poor living conditions in the surrounding areas including Clarendon which at the time of the incident had the highest child poverty rates in Salford at 75%. However Prime Minister David Cameron dismissed these claims, stating that the rioters were merely "Opportunistic Thugs" in a statement to the House of Commons.

Tesco controversy

In October 2010 Salford City Council gave the go ahead for a new £45 million Tesco superstore to be built on Pendleton way opposite the site of Salford Shopping City. The plan involved the demolition of St James's R.C. Primary School which had stood on the site since the early 1900s, the demolition of Emmanuel Church which was to be later rebuilt on Langworthy Road and the permanent closure of Pendleton Way.

The proposal was met with fierce opposition from both Salford Estates (owners of Salford Shopping City) who had purchased the site for £40 million in March 2010 and local residents. Gareth Edmunds of Salford Estates claimed that "traders can't compete with a Tesco of that size" and it would "destroy Salford Shopping City." On 21 October 2010 Salford Estates launched judicial review proceedings against the Salford City Council over the sale of the land to Tesco and presented them with a petition with over 8,000 signatures from local traders and residents rejecting the proposal.

Despite this construction commenced in early 2012, the store was designed by Smith Smalley Architects and constructed by Patton Construction. The store opened on 15 November 2012. Tesco claimed the 24-hour store would create over 600 new jobs with at least half of them going to locally unemployed people.

Future development

Salford Estates have promised to continue to develop the site. In late 2012 the original market which had stood since 1970 was removed and replaced with 3 units. One of the units is a 15,900 sq ft supermarket to be occupied by Aldi opened in January 2014 and created over 80 jobs. Two further 5,000 sq ft non-food units have not yet been pre-let.

In November 2013 a 2,661 sq ft KFC opened, creating 40 new jobs.

Development was planned to continue through 2014 and beyond, including over 90,000 sq ft of additional retail space split into two extensions of 13 double height shop units. As of 2021, this work has not commenced, with no plans to begin works.

In 2020, the bus stops and Hankinson Way were redeveloped as part of the Salford Bolton Network Improvements package.

References

External links
 

Shopping centres in Greater Manchester
Buildings and structures in Salford